Ericameria arizonica is a North American species of flowering shrub in the family Asteraceae known as Arizona goldenbush or Grand Canyon goldenweed. It has been found only on the cliffs on the south rim of the Grand Canyon in Coconino County, Arizona.

Ericameria arizonica is a shrub up to 50 cm (20 inches) tall. It has elliptic to narrowly oblanceolate leaves up to 35 mm (1.4 inches) long. Flower heads are in flat-topped arrays, each with both disc florets and ray florets.

References 

arizonica
Flora of Arizona
Flora of the Colorado Plateau and Canyonlands region
Endemic flora of the United States
Natural history of the Grand Canyon
Plants described in 2005
Flora without expected TNC conservation status